Saccard is a fictional character created by Émile Zola in his 20-novel cycle Les Rougon-Macquart. Saccard (a pseudonym of the character Aristide Rougon) is the central figure in the novels La Curée (1872) and L'Argent (1891), and features in a number of other books in the cycle. A ruthless and greedy financier, his name is still used in France as a byword for corporate or plutocratic figures driven by lust for money.

Les Rougon-Macquart characters
Fictional French people